John D. Rateliff is an author of roleplaying games and an independent scholar. He specializes in the study of the works of J. R. R. Tolkien, particularly his Middle-earth fantasy writings.

Early life and education

John D. Rateliff was raised in Magnolia, Arkansas. He moved to Wisconsin in 1981 to study Tolkien's manuscripts at Marquette University. Rateliff is an expert in Tolkien studies, and he earned a Ph.D in 20th-century British literature from Marquette.

Career

Rateliff has helped organize several major conferences on Tolkien. He contributed essays to Tolkien's Legendarium: Essays on The History of Middle-earth (2000) and to a volume marking the fiftieth anniversary of the publication of The Lord of the Rings, and edited The History of The Hobbit (HarperCollins, 2007), an edition of the drafting of Tolkien's The Hobbit with extensive commentary. Having written his dissertation on Lord Dunsany, Rateliff likes to describe his degree as "a Ph.D in fantasy."

He worked for the game companies TSR, Wizards of the Coast, and Hasbro for a number of years, contributing to a large number of products in the Dungeons and Dragons line. In addition he worked as a freelancer for several other companies.

Rateliff was the co-editor of the third edition D&D Player's Handbook and Dungeon Master's Guide (the original d20 System game rules), and worked on such titles as Mark of Amber, Night Below, Return to the Tomb of Horrors, the Eberron core rulebook, and Decipher's Lord of the Rings Roleplaying Game. He is the author of the adventures Standing Stone and Return to the Keep on the Borderlands, as well as co-editor of and contributor to d20 Cthulhu.

Publications

Children's books 
 Egypt (Children of the World) (with Valerie Weber and Julie Brown; Gareth Stevens Publishing) (1992)

Roleplaying
Player's Survival Kit/Book, Adventurer's Log, and Cards (Advanced Dungeons & Dragons, 2nd Edition) ( - March 1995)
Return to the Keep on the Borderlands (Advanced Dungeons & Dragons/AD&D)(1999)
Reverse Dungeon (Advanced Dungeons & Dragons/AD&D) (May 1, 2000)
Hero Builder's Guidebook - Dungeons & Dragons (co-author) (2000)
The Standing Stone: An Adventure for 7th-Level Characters (Dungeons & Dragons Adventure) (April 1, 2001)
Co-author Decipher The Lord of the Rings Roleplaying Game (2002)
EverQuest Player's Handbook (2002)
Fushigi Yûgi: Ultimate Fan Guide #1 (September 30, 2002)

Studies of works by the Inklings

 "Early Versions of Farmer Giles of Ham" in Leaves from the Tree: J. R. R. Tolkien's Shorter Fiction,  The Tolkien Society (1991)
 "Rhetorical Strategies in Charles William's Prose Play" in The Rhetoric of Vision: Essays on Charles Williams edited by Charles A. Huttar and Peter J. Schakel (1996)
 "'The Lost Road', 'The Dark Tower', and 'The Notion Club Papers': Tolkien and Lewis's Time Travel Triad" in Tolkien's Legendarium: Essays on The History of Middle-earth edited by Verlyn Flieger and Carl F. Hostetter (2000)
 The History of The Hobbit (2007)

References

External links
Sacnoth's Scriptorium - John D. Rateliff's Official Website

Tolkien Gateway Interview of John D. Rateliff
Audio interview with John D. Rateliff. National Review.

Dungeons & Dragons game designers
Independent scholars
Living people
Marquette University alumni
Tolkien Society members
Tolkien studies
Year of birth missing (living people)